Maguarichi   is a town and seat of the municipality of Maguarichi, in the northern Mexican state of Chihuahua. As of 2010, the town had a population of 801, up from 751 as of 2005.

References

Populated places in Chihuahua (state)